Adam Void is an artist and musician living in Asheville, North Carolina. Void has worked under the pseudonym AVOID pi since 1999 and has produced numerous public works across the United States. He began his artistic career in South Carolina and in 2006 moved to Brooklyn, New York to produce graffiti on a national level. In 2007, he reintroduced fire extinguisher graffiti to Brooklyn, New York through a series of high-profile public sites. 

In 2015, Adam and his wife, artist Chelsea Ragan, founded the School of the Alternative (or Black Mountain School), an experiment in education and community based on the original campus of Black Mountain College. The project is a contemporary DIY interpretation of BMC, featuring a collaborative learning environment where educators create the content of study, students determine their level of engagement, and tuition is affordable for all. The school continues to challenge traditional education and has brought together artists, thinkers, and educators from across the globe.

AVOID is a main character in the 2016 existential fantasy film, Wastedland 2 (Dir. Andrew H. Shirley). Heralded as "A new Wizard of Oz for the Anarchist Street Youth." by Charlie Ahearn, Wastedland 2 is set in a post-apocalyptic land, the last few remaining inhabitants are the spirit animals of graffiti writers. The film has toured the United States as a Do-It-Yourself art show and experimental film screening.

References

External links 
 AdamVoid.com

Street artists
American graffiti artists
Year of birth missing (living people)
Living people